Uttaradit (Northern Thai:) is one of Thailand's seventy-six provinces (changwat). It lies in upper northern Thailand. Neighboring provinces are (from south clockwise) Phitsanulok, Sukhothai, Phrae and Nan. To the east it borders Xaignabouli of Laos. Uttaradit is 488 km north of Bangkok, and 238 km southeast of Chiang Mai.

History
Uttaradit means the "port of the north" or "northern landing", as it was formerly a trade center on the Nan River.

In the Sukhothai era several city states (Mueang) subject to the king were in the area of the modern province. Mueang Fang was in modern-day Mueang Uttaradit district, Mueang Thung Yang in Laplae, and Mueang Ta Chuchok in Tron district.

During the Ayutthaya kingdom, Mueang Phichai was one of the 16 main Mueang of the Thai kingdom. In the reign of King Naresuan, the ruler of Phichai rebelled, joined by the ruler of the Sawankhalok region. Their revolt was suppressed and the inhabitants of both cities were forced to move south to Phitsanulok.

Following the fall of the city of Ayutthaya to the Burmese in 1767, Phichai was the site of several battles against the invaders. The ruler of Phichai succeeded in driving back the Burmese and was awarded the title Phraya Phichai Dap Hak - the "Lord of Pichai with a Broken Sword", as he had broken one of his swords in fierce hand-to-hand combat with the enemy.

In the reign of King Rama III Mueang Phichai controlled several Mueang of northern Siam like Nan or Phrae, and even Luang Prabang and Vientiane. At the point where the Nan river became shallow a port was established. As this town grew in importance as an important trade point, in 1887 it was made a Mueang subordinate of Phichai. 1899 the center of Phichai was moved to this new location, which was renamed to Uttaradit in 1915.

Geography
The province is in the Nan River valley. About 45 kilometers north of the city of Uttaradit is the Queen Sirikit Dam, which created a 250 km2 artificial lake. The Phi Pan Nam Range reaches the northwest of the province.

Most of the province was once covered with teak forests, then the major product of Uttaradit. The largest teak tree in the world is found at the Ton Sak Yai Park in the Luang Prabang Range. The 1,500-year-old tree measures 9.87 m in circumference and 37 m in height. Originally it was 48.5 m high, but it was damaged in a storm.

National parks
There are three national parks, along with seven other national parks, make up region 11 (Phitsanulok) of Thailand's protected areas.
 Lam Nam Nan National Park, 
 Ton Sak Yai National Park, 
 Phu Soi Dao National Park,

Wildlife sanctuaries
There are a total of four wildlife sanctuaries, three ofwhich are in region 11 (Phitsanulok) and Lam Nam Nan Fang Khwa Wildlife Sanctuary is in region 13 (Phrae) of Thailand's protected areas. 
 Phu Miang–Phu Thong Wildlife Sanctuary, 
 Mae Charim Wildlife Sanctuary, 
 Nam Pat Wildlife Sanctuary, 
 Lam Nam Nan Fang Khwa Wildlife Sanctuary,

Symbols
The provincial seal shows the mondop at the temple Wat Phra Thaen Sila At, in Baan Phra Thaen in the Laplae district. The main item of worship in the temple is a laterite block, which is believed to have been used by Buddha to seek enlightenment. The mondhop is built upon this block.

The seal was first designed in 1940, later a garuda as the symbol of Thailand and the name of the province were added.

The provincial tree is the teak (Tectona grandis). The largest teak tree in the world stands in Sak Yai Forest Park (สักใหญ่). The tree, estimated to be more than 1,500 years old, is 37 meters high and has a circumference of 9.58 meters at its base. Although the upper part of the tree broke off in a storm, the trunk is still alive. Discovered in 1927, the giant teak tree is part of the 35 square kilometer park of mixed deciduous forest.

Administrative divisions

Provincial government
The province is divided into nine districts (amphoe). These are further divided into 67 subdistricts (tambon) and 562 villages (muban).

Local government
As of 26 November 2019 there are: one Uttaradit Provincial Administration Organisation and 26 municipal (thesaban) areas in the province. Uttaradit has town (thesaban mueang) status. Further 25 subdistrict municipalities (thesaban tambon). The non-municipal areas are administered by 53 Subdistrict Administrative Organisations - SAO (ongkan borihan suan tambon).

Health 
Uttaradit's main hospital is Uttaradit Hospital, operated by the Ministry of Public Health.

Economy
Uttaradit is largely an agricultural province. Among its best known crops are two fruits: durian and langsat. 
A durian festival is held each year around the beginning of June in Laplae District. The province is known for two varieties of durian which lack the usual, and to some people offensive, odour: Longlaplae and Linlaplae, both named after Laplae District. Durian production in Uttaradit province was estimated to be around 20,000 tonnes in 2012. The province has approximately 10,600 acres of durian orchards.

The langsat (ลางสาด) (Lansium parasiticum), for which Uttaradit is famous, and its thick-skinned sibling, longkong (ลองกอง), is a fruit that is similar in taste to the longan. A langsat festival is held each year around the middle to end of September.

Transport 

Uttaradit is served by the Northern Line of the State Railway of Thailand. There are two stations in Uttaradit town: Uttaradit railway station, the main station and Sila At railway station, where it is a major centre for Northern Line operations. It does not have an airport. The nearest airport is in Phrae.

Human achievement index 2017

Since 2003, United Nations Development Programme (UNDP) in Thailand has tracked progress on human development at sub-national level using the Human Achievement Index (HAI), a composite index covering all the eight key areas of human development. National Economic and Social Development Board (NESDB) has taken over this task since 2017.

Gallery

References

External links

Website of the province (Thai only)

 
Provinces of Thailand